Ecsenius lubbocki, known commonly as the Lubbock's combtooth-blenny in Indonesia, is a species of combtooth blenny in the genus Ecsenius. It is found in coral reefs in Phuket, Thailand, in the eastern Indian ocean. It can reach a maximum length of 4 centimetres. Blennies in this species feed primarily off of plants, including benthic algae and weeds. The specific name honours the English marine biologist Hugh Roger Lubbock (1951-1981), the collector  of the type specimens, he recognised that they were a new species of Ecsenius.

References

lubbocki
Fish described in 1988
Taxa named by Victor G. Springer